Anna Danilina and Ingrid Neel were the defending champions, having won the previous edition in 2019, but both players chose not to participate.

Fanny Stollár and Aldila Sutjiadi won the title, defeating Rasheeda McAdoo and Peyton Stearns in the final, 6–0, 6–4.

Seeds

Draw

Draw

References
Main Draw

LTP Charleston Pro Tennis II - Doubles
LTP Charleston Pro Tennis